Wendell may refer to:

Places in the United States
Wendell, Idaho
Wendell, Massachusetts
Wendell, Minnesota
Wendell, North Carolina

People
Wendell (name), a list of people with the name
Wendell (footballer, born 1947) (1947–2022), full name Wendell Lucena Ramalho, Brazilian football manager and former goalkeeper
Wendell (footballer, born 1989), full name Wendell Nogueira de Araújo, Brazilian football midfielder
Wendell (footballer, born 1993), full name Wendell Nascimento Borges, Brazilian football left-back

See also
Wendel (disambiguation)